Charles d'Helfer (1598–1661) was a French baroque composer and maître de musique at Soissons Cathedral. His masses follow a strict one syllable per note style.

He is best remembered for his requiem for four voices of 1656 which was used for the funeral of composer Michel Richard Delalande in 1726 and was the basis of Julien-Amable Mathieu (1734-1811) and François Giroust's requiem mass for Louis XV in 1775.

Works
 Missa quatuor vocum ad imitationem moduli Benedicam Dominum, Paris 1653
 Missa pro defunctis quatuor vocum, Paris 1656
 Missa quatuor vocum ad moduli Lorsque d'un désir curieux, Paris 1658
 Missa sex vocum ad imitationem moduli In aeternum cantabo, Paris 1658
 Vespres et Hymnes de l'année avec plusieurs motets du St. Sacrement, de la Vierge des SS. et patrons de lieux etc à 4 parties, Paris 1660
 Missa quatuor vocum ad imitationem moduli Deliciae Regum, Paris 1664
 Missa sex vocum ad imitationem moduli Quid videbis in Sunamitae, Paris 1674
 Missa quatuor vocibus ad imitationem moduli Laetatus sum, Paris 1678

Recordings
 Requiem, with funeral oration for Charles III, Duke of Lorraine (d.1608). A Sei Voci. 1994

References

Sources 
Jean-Paul C. Montagnier, The Polyphonic Mass in France, 1600-1780: The Evidence of the Printed Choirbooks, Cambridge: Cambridge University Press, 2017.

1598 births
1661 deaths
French Baroque composers
17th-century classical composers
French male classical composers
17th-century male musicians